Christian Ritter (born 9 August 1984) is a German former football player.

Ritter made one Bundesliga appearance for VfL Wolfsburg, replacing Martin Petrov in a 3–1 win over 1860 Munich in February 2004.

References

External links 
 

1984 births
Living people
German footballers
Association football forwards
Bundesliga players
VfL Wolfsburg players
VfL Wolfsburg II players
Tennis Borussia Berlin players
Sportfreunde Lotte players
Berliner FC Dynamo players
Lupo Martini Wolfsburg players